Buala Sasakul (born 21 October 1960) is a Thai boxer. He competed in the men's lightweight event at the 1984 Summer Olympics.

References

External links
 

1960 births
Living people
Buala Sasakul
Buala Sasakul
Boxers at the 1984 Summer Olympics
Place of birth missing (living people)
Lightweight boxers